San Pedro Masahuat is a municipality in the La Paz department of El Salvador.

References

Municipalities of the La Paz Department (El Salvador)